The Southern Loloish or Southern Ngwi languages, also known as the Hanoish (Hanish) languages, constitute a branch of the Loloish languages that includes Akha and Hani.

Languages

The branches included in Lama (2012), with languages from Bradley (2007), are:

Hanoid in Lama (2012) is alternatively called Akoid in Bradley (2007), who recognizes the Hani-Akha and Haoni-Baihong languages as part of the Akoid group.

Other Southern Loloish languages are:
Muda
Paza (Phusang), a recently discovered language of northern Laos related to Sila
Bana or Bala in Laos. Speakers are included in the Kaw (Akha) ethnic group. The language is now being replaced by other larger languages such as Akha and Lahu.
Suobi 梭比, spoken in Yinyuan Township 因远镇, Yuanjiang County
Nuobi 糯比, closely related to Suobi
Cosao, a Southern Loloish language closely related to Khir
Yiche 奕车, spoken in Honghe County

Kato (2008) also documents:
Muteun
Khongsat
Khir

Other Southern Loloish language varieties in south-central Yunnan include Bukong 布孔, Budu 布都, Asuo 阿梭, Duota 堕塔, Amu 阿木, Lami 腊米, Qiedi 切弟, Kabie 卡别, Woni 窝尼, Duoni 多尼, and Habei 哈备. Habei is unclassified within Southern Loloish.

Hsiu (2016, 2018)
A 2016 computational phylogenetic lexical analysis by Hsiu (2016) distinguished the following five branches of Southern Loloish, providing further support for the Hanoid (Akoid) and Bisoid branches in Lama (2012) and Bradley (2007). A new Siloid branch was added.
Hanoid
Bisoid
Siloid
Bi-Ka (?)
Jinuo

Southern Loloish
Hanoid
Ko-Pala, Ko-Luma
(core branch)
Hani languages
Hani
Haoni (of Shuigui), Baihong, Suobi
Akha
Muteun
(branch)
Akha-Nukui, Ko-Phuso
Ko-Puli
Ko-Chipia
Ko-Eupa
Ko-Nyau
Ko-Oma
Bisoid
Khongsat
Laoseng
Sangkong
Pyen
(core branch)
Lao-Pan
Bisu
Phunoi
Phongset
Phongku (Phu-Lawa)
Phunyot
Siloid
Wanyä
(core branch)
Phusang
Khir, Cosao
Sila (Sida)
Bi-Ka
Jinuo

The Southern Loloish tree above was subsequently revised by Hsiu (2018) as follows, with 6 subgroups included.

Southern Loloish
Hani-Akha
Hanoid: Hani, Nuomei, Nuobi, Lami, Luomian, Angluo, Guohe, Guozuo, Gehuo, Yiche, Qidi, Kabie, Haoni cluster (Haoni, Woni, Baihong, Bukong, Budu, Suobi, Duoni, Duota, Asuo, Amu)
Akoid: Nukui, Phuso, Puli, Chepya, Eupa, Nyau, Oma, Chicho, Ulo, Muteun, Muda, etc.
Bi-Ka
Biyue, Enu
Kaduo
Siloid
Luma, Pala
Akeu, Gokhy
Wanyä (Muchi)
Sila cluster: Sila, Sida, Paza (Phusang), Khir, Cosao, Phana
Bisoid
Bisu cluster: Bisu, Laomian, Laopin, Pyen, Laopan
Singsali cluster: Phunoi, Singsali, Cantan, Laoseng, Phongku, Phongset, Phunyot
Coong cluster: Cốông, Sangkong, Tsukong
Cauho
Bantang
Khongsat
Habei (Mani)
Mpi
Jino

Hsiu (2018) considers the Hani-Akha and Bi-Ka subgroups to be part of a northern linkage in south-central Yunnan, while the Siloid, Bisoid, Jino, and Mpi subgroups are part of a southern linkage in the China-Laos border region.

Innovations
Lama (2012) lists the following changes from Proto-Loloish as Hanoish innovations.

 *m- → zero /__[u] (Hani and Haoni)
 *kh- > x- (Hani and Haoni)
 *N- > NC or C (nasal hardening rule in Bisu and Sangkong)
 Reversed order of syllables (family-wide)

References

 Bradley, David. 2007. East and Southeast Asia. In Moseley, Christopher (ed.), Encyclopedia of the World's Endangered Languages, 349-424. London & New York: Routledge.
 Lama, Ziwo Qiu-Fuyuan (2012), Subgrouping of Nisoic (Yi) Languages, thesis, University of Texas at Arlington (archived)
 Kingsadā, Thō̜ngphet, and Tadahiko Shintani. 1999 Basic Vocabularies of the Languages Spoken in Phongxaly, Lao P.D.R. Tokyo: Institute for the Study of Languages and Cultures of Asia and Africa (ILCAA).
 Shintani, Tadahiko, Ryuichi Kosaka, and Takashi Kato. 2001. Linguistic Survey of Phongxaly, Lao P.D.R. Tokyo: Institute for the Study of Languages and Cultures of Asia and Africa (ILCAA).
 Kato, Takashi. 2008. Linguistic Survey of Tibeto-Burman languages in Lao P.D.R. Tokyo: Institute for the Study of Languages and Cultures of Asia and Africa (ILCAA).